The following is a list of recurring Saturday Night Live characters and sketches introduced between September 13, 2008, and May 16, 2009, the thirty-fourth season of the show.

Googie Rene
Kenan Thompson sells discounted garments with mysterious stains.

Appearances

A sketch featuring "Googie Rene's Partially Damaged Christmas Decorations" was included in the dress rehearsal for the December 10, 2011, episode, hosted by Katy Perry, but was cut for the live broadcast.

The Lawrence Welk Show
A parody of the original "mildly-entertaining" Lawrence Welk Show, this PBS rerun, hosted by Fred Armisen as Welk, features the singing act The Maharelle Sisters, from the Finger Lakes. The performance in the original Maharelle sisters skit closely resembles that of Rosemary Clooney and Vera-Ellen in the 1954 movie White Christmas. Each performance begins by featuring each of three attractive, flirtatious women, before introducing the fourth sister, Dooneese (Kristen Wiig), (sometimes spelled "Judice"; spellings differ in SNL sources) whose deformities include an extremely tall forehead, tiny hands the size of an infant's, and an odd canine tooth. As each of the women sings in turn, Dooneese's contribution at the end is inevitably a weird or disturbing rant, such as describing eating roadkill or having worms in her hair. She often makes inappropriate sexual advances toward any men co-starring in the performance.

The three normal sisters have been played by both guests and cast members, including Jenny Slate, Abby Elliott, Michaela Watkins, Casey Wilson, Nasim Pedrad, Vanessa Bayer, Amy Poehler, Ana Gasteyer, Maya Rudolph, Cecily Strong and Anne Hathaway.

Jeff Montgomery
A Will Forte character.

Appearances

A sketch featuring Jeff Montgomery and his father (played by special guest Dan Aykroyd) terrorizing their neighbors was included in the dress rehearsal for the February 14, 2009 episode (hosted Alec Baldwin), but was cut for the live broadcast.

A sketch featuring Jeff Montgomery trick-or-treating was included in the dress rehearsal for the October 17, 2009, episode (hosted by Gerard Butler), but was cut for the live broadcast.

Stefon

Bill Hader plays Stefon, a club kid and city correspondent for Weekend Update. He is asked by Seth Meyers to offer tips on wholesome things for tourists to do in New York City, but instead offers tips on the hottest (or more accurately, most bizarre) New York nightlife. May 18, 2013 marked the final appearance of Stefon as a recurring character, as Hader concluded his final season as SNL cast member.

Appearances

Grady Wilson
Kenan Thompson plays the Sanford and Son character Grady Wilson as the host of a series of instructional sex films.

Appearances

The Vogelchecks
Fred Armisen, Kristen Wiig and Bill Hader star in this sketch about a family that expresses affection, at the slightest provocation, with slobbery French kissing and other disturbingly intimate acts. In the sketch, another member of the family (usually played by the episode's host) brings home a new girlfriend/boyfriend to meet his parents (Armisen and Wiig) and brother Dwayne (Hader). The girlfriend is initially put off by the family's eager physical affection, but is won over by a heartfelt speech from Armisen.

Appearances

Dateline
Bill Hader plays Dateline correspondent Keith Morrison hosting "Real-Life Crimes and Stories of Real People in Bad Situations", a series of short interviews with victims of pain and suffering. The sketch revolves around Morrison's sinister persona: during the interviews, Hader utters trite remarks, makes creepy faces and sounds, expresses disgust at awful things not happening, and admits he gets a creepy delight out of other people's suffering.

Appearances

Hader reprised his Keith Morrison impression in the September 24, 2009, episode of Weekend Update Thursday, where he interviewed President Obama (Fred Armisen) about the "death panel" issue.

Shana
Kristen Wiig plays an outwardly sexy woman (strongly resembling Marilyn Monroe) who nonetheless does everything in the least sexy way possible. In each sketch she enters a room where several male coworkers were present, all of whom are initially attracted by her curvaceous contours, her sweet childlike voice, her fetching walk, and her shy and demure demeanor. However, her behavior is quickly punctuated with belches, farts, accidental urination or defecation, loud braying laughs, tasteless and vulgar remarks, and fits of spastic, uncoordinated movement.  By the end of the sketch, all of the men except one (usually played by the episode's host) are completely repulsed by her; the holdout is even more smitten than when she first arrived.

In an interview with Alec Baldwin, in which he complimented Wiig on her ability to switch between sexy and unsexy characters, Wiig replied:I have to say, one of the greatest gifts that I've gotten from SNL is getting out of my comfort zone. I realized, and I think Lorne [Michaels] realized, probably the first handful of years that I was there, most of my characters were ladies in their forties with short hair and weird sweaters, that no one wanted at their dinner party. The good thing about being at SNL, for me creatively, is to think, "Okay, I'm comfortable enough. I really want to try something that's not something that I normally do." That's when I actually first came up with the character Shana, the one that’s sexy but says gross things."

Appearances

Gilly
A mischievous schoolgirl played by Kristen Wiig. In the standard Gilly sketch, Mr. Dillon (Will Forte) is attempting to teach his class of young students, but the class is repeatedly interrupted by pranks. After each prank, Mr. Dillon asks first Liam (Bobby Moynihan), then Sam (Kenan Thompson), if they are responsible, and the boys deny it (especially easy for Sam as his arms are both in casts). A female student usually Paula (Abby Elliott) then says that Gilly did it, and Gilly offers an insincere "sorry." The cycle repeats with the pranks becoming more dangerous and violent.

Appearances

Angie Tempura
Michaela Watkins appears on Weekend Update as a snarky blogger for gossip website bitchpleeze.com.

Appearances

Game Time with Randy And Greg
Kenan Thompson and Bill Hader star in these sketches, in which sports presenter Randy Dukes desperately tries to convince the audience that his co-host, Greg, is not an alien, despite everything in Greg's behavior proving otherwise.

Appearances

Hamilton
Hamilton, played by Will Forte, is a creepy man with a blonde bob cut and large round sunglasses, who commandeers the microphone at various events. For some reason, women find him irresistibly alluring.

Appearances

The dress rehearsal for the March 6, 2010, episode featured a sketch in which Hamilton interrupted a lesbian wedding to beg one of the brides for a second chance; the sketch was cut from the live episode.

References

Lists of recurring Saturday Night Live characters and sketches
Saturday Night Live in the 2000s
Saturday Night Live
Saturday Night Live